Paklino is a rural locality (a selo) and the administrative center of Paklinsky Selsoviet, Bayevsky District, Altai Krai, Russia. The population was 306 as of 2013. There are 8 streets.

Geography 
Paklino is located 45 km southeast of Bayevo (the district's administrative centre) by road. Safronovo is the nearest rural locality.

References 

Rural localities in Bayevsky District